Belogradchik is a town in Vidin Province, Northwestern Bulgaria, the administrative centre of the homonymous Belogradchik Municipality. The town, whose name literally means "small white town," is situated in the foothills of the Balkan Mountains just east of the Serbian border and about 50 km south of the Danube River. The town is close to the Belogradchik Rocks, which cover an area of 90 square kilometers and reach up to 200 meters in height. , it has a population of 5,334 inhabitants.

Tourism 
The town is a tourist destination. Local landmarks include the medieval Belogradchik Fortress and the Belogradchik Rocks.

Other tourist attractions in the area are the nearby Magura Cave, famous for its prehistoric cave paintings, and the Baba Vida medieval fortress in the nearby town of Vidin on the Danube river.

International relations

Gallery

References

External links 
 

Towns in Bulgaria
Populated places in Vidin Province
Belogradchik Municipality